The First Unitarian Church is a historic church in Peabody, Massachusetts.  The wood-frame church was built in 1826, when the area was known as South Danvers.  The front facade has a projecting rounded entrance hall decorated with pilasters and a heavily bracketed cornice.  The main part of the facade also has pilasters rising to a pedimented gable that has large-scale dentil molding.  The side walls have six lancet-style windows.  The tower, which lacks a steeple, has quoined corners, and molding on the cornice of its roofline that matches that of the main roof.

The church building was listed on the National Register of Historic Places in 1989.  It has been converted to condominiums.

See also
National Register of Historic Places listings in Essex County, Massachusetts

References

Unitarian Universalist churches in Massachusetts
Churches on the National Register of Historic Places in Massachusetts
Churches in Essex County, Massachusetts
Buildings and structures in Peabody, Massachusetts
National Register of Historic Places in Essex County, Massachusetts
History of Peabody, Massachusetts